Herren von Graben, also named von (dem) Graben, vom Graben, Grabner, Grabner zu Rosenburg, Graben zu Kornberg, Graben zu Sommeregg, Graben von (zum) Stein, and ab dem Graben was the name of an old Austrian noble family.

History 
Originally from Carniola, an apparent (or illegitimate) branch of the House of Meinhardin, the family spread in neighboring countries. The earliest known members of the Graben family, Konrad and his brother Grimoald von Graben, lived around 1170.

During the middle ages family went on to rule some Carinthian, Lower Austrian, Tyrolian, East Tyrols, Styrian, Gorizian and modern Italian districts as Burggrafen (a sort of viscount) and Herren (lords) from the early Middle Ages until the 16th-17th centuries. The last member was Felix Jakob von Graben who lives in Tyrol; the family died out in 1776 or 1780.

Coat of arms 
There are three forms of representation of the gender coat of arms, Von Graben, which have their connection to one another through the established family genealogy. Originally, the family carried the coat of arms with the blue oblique beam to silver. From 1328 (until 1556/1564), the Von Graben family of the Kornberg line bore the coat of arms with the shovel (silver shovel on red). However, the derived line Von Graben zu Sommeregg (Andreas von Graben, d. 1463) adopted the oblique beam coat of arms (red, divided by blue and silver) at the time when it was converted into  Ortenburger services came. A distinction is made between the family coat of arms with the blue diagonal left bar on silver (also variant with diagonal right bar), the silver shovel on red coat of arms and the coat of arms split from red, and divided three times by blue and silver (or black).

 Line am Graben (Carniola): blue diagonal left bar on silver
 Line am Graben, Grabenhofen (Graz, Styria): blue diagonal left bar on silver (also variant with diagonal right bar)
 Branch at Thal: blue diagonal left bar on silver (also variant with diagonal right bar)
 Rosenberger branch (later House of Orsini-RosenbergI): blue diagonal right bar on silver
 Line Grabner zu Rosenburg (Second line in Lower Austria): blue diagonal right bar on silver
 Kornberg line (Styria): silver shovel on red
 First line in Lower Austria: silver shovel on red
 First Tyrolean line: silver shovel on red
 Swiss line: silver shovel coat on red
 Family Graeff / De Graeff: silver shovel on red
 Sommeregg line (Carinthia): split from red, and divided three times by blue and silver
 Line am Stein (Carinthia): split from red, and divided three times by blue and silver
 Second Tyrolean line: split from red, and divided three times by blue and silver

The lines of the family 

Originally from Carniola, a line settled in Styria around Graz. This line is named "Line Am Graben". During the later 13th century the later princely family Orsini-Rosenberg descended from a member of the family who lived at the Grazer Castle Alt-Grabenhofen, between Reinerkogel and Rosenberg. During the early 14th century, the family split into four main lines, the Styrian Grabenhofen line, the Grabner (zu Rosenburg) line in Lower Austria, the Kornberger line and their Dutch offspring (De) Graeff, and during the earlier 15th century in the Carynthian-Lienzer Sommeregger line. In 1500, the family split into a new line, the Stein Line at Castle Stein. Two other lines of the Graben family can be found in Tyrol, and one in Switzerland. A detailed list of the lines and branches can be found here:
 Counts of Gorizia, Meinhardin
 Line Am Graben (Carniola), before 1170-13th century
 Line Am Graben, Grabenhofen (Graz, Styria), before 1259-1468
 Branch at Thal, early 14th century-after 1341
 Rosenberger branch (later House of Orsini-RosenbergI), after 1322
 Line Grabner zu Rosenburg (Second line in Lower Austria), before 1314-mid 17th century
 Kornberg line (Styria), before 1325-1564
 First line in Lower Austria, 1324-1421
 First Tyrolean line, 2nd half 15th century-after 1519
 Swiss line, unknown
 Graeff / De Graeff family (The Netherlands), 1484
 Sommeregg line (Carinthia), before 1436-early 17th century
 Line am Stein (Carinthia), 1500-1664 in male line
 Second Tyrolean line, early 16th century-1776/80

Kornberger line 

The Grabner zu Kornberg came from Styria in Graz and belonged to the same tribe as the Grabner zu Rosenburg. The first important member of the family was Ulrich II von Graben (named between 1300–1361), who was elevated to the Styrian title of Burggraf of Hohenwang. The Styrian line's residence between 1328 and 1556 was at Schloss Kornberg. Between 1456 and 1564, the Kornberg line was owned the important Lordship Marburg with Obermarburg and the Marburg Castle. They were linked by marriage with the Lords of Windisch-Graetz, Auersperg, Stubenberg, and Guttenberg. The Dutch family De Graeff claimed descent from Wolfgang von Graben, a member of the Graben family. Andries de Graeff and his son Cornelis became Free Imperial knights of the Holy Roman Empire. That diploma dates from 19 July 1677: 

Fide digis itegur genealogistarum Amsteldamensium edocti testimoniis te Andream de Graeff [Andries de Graeff] non paternum solum ex pervetusta in Comitatu nostro Tyrolensi von Graben dicta familia originem ducere, qua olim per quendam ex ascendentibus tuis ejus nominis in Belgium traducta et in Petrum de Graeff [Pieter Graeff], abavum, Johannem [Jan Pietersz Graeff], proavum, Theodorum [Dirck Jansz Graeff], avum, ac tandem Jacobum [Jacob Dircksz de Graeff], patrem tuum, viros in civitate, Amstelodamensi continua serie consulatum scabinatus senatorii ordinis dignitabitus conspicuos et in publicum bene semper meritos propagata nobiliter et cum splendore inter suos se semper gessaerit interque alios honores praerogativasque nobilibus eo locorum proprias liberum venandi jus in Hollandia, Frisiaque occidentale ac Ultrajectina provinciis habuerit semper et exercuerit.

The Kornberg line died out in 1664 with the death of Anna von Graben. The Lords of Stadl were heirs to their extensive Estate. The inheritance included the possessions of Marburg / Maribor, Kornberg, Rohrbach an der Lafnitz, Grabenhofen with Alt-Grabenhofen Castle, Liechtenberg and Krottenhofen.

Members 
 Ulrich II von Graben (named between 1300 and 1361)
 Friedrich II von Graben († before 1463)
 Ulrich III von Graben († 1486)
 Wolfgang von Graben (1465-1521)
 Andrä von Graben († 1556)

Line Grabner zu Rosenburg 

The Grabner zu Rosenburg came from Styria in Graz and belonged to the same tribe as the Kornberger Graben. They had extensive property with the Rosenburg and Pottenbrunn as well as in Moravia and was one of the advocates of Protestantism during the Reformation in Lower Austria. In the 16th century the Grabner Rosenburg made a center of the Austrian Reformation history. During the 16th and early 17th centuries, the Grabner were among the richest and most respected families in Austria, and one of the country's dominant Protestant noble families.

Members 
 Sebastian I Grabner zu Rosenburg ( † 1535), leading Protestant
 Leopold Grabner zu Rosenburg (1528–1583), leading protestant
 Sebastian II Grabner zu Rosenburg, leading Protestant

Sommeregger line 

The Sommeregger line which came from the Kornberg line, was the most important family at the court of the Meinhardins of Gorizia in the late 15th and early 16th centuries. During the later Middle Ages, the success of that family arose from the steady accumulation of land, and loyalty to the Counts of Görz and later to the Habsburg Emperor. The line resided in Lienz, East Tyrol and Carinthia, and became "the most prominent of the family". Family members held the noble titles as the Burgraves of Sommeregg, Heinfels and Lienz. After the death of Leonhard of Gorizia in 1500, they became his successors as stadtholders of Lienz and East Tyrol. The Lienzer line died out in the year 1534, and the zum Stein in 1664.

They were linked by marriage with the Lords of Auersperg, Saurau and Breuner.

Members 
 Andreas von Graben (early 15th century-1463)
 Cosmas von Graben (15th century)
 Virgil von Graben (1430/1440-1507)
 Rosina von Graben von Rain (15th century-1534)

Line at Stein 
The line at Stein came from Carinthia and East Tyrol and sprang out of the Sommeregger line. The family Held the title Lord of Stein.
 Lukas von Graben zum Stein (15th-1550)

Tyrolian line 
The Tyrolian line came from Carinthia and East Tyrol and sprang out of the line Graben zum Stein.
 Otto von Graben zum Stein, was named "Graf zum Stein" (1690–1756)

Feudal

Burgraviates 

 Burgrave of Lienz 
 Burgrave and Lord of the manor Heinfels
 Burgrave and Lord of the manor Hohenwang
 Burgrave and Lord of the manor Sommeregg 
 Burgrave and Lord of the manor Lengberg
 Burgrave and Lord of the manor Saldenhofen
 Burgrave and Lord of the manor Gleichenberg
 Burgrave and Lord of the manor Riegersburg 
 Burgrave and Lord of the manor Landskron

High Lordships 
 High Lordship and Castle of Straß
 High Lordship of Marburg an der Drau and Castle of Obermarburg

Lordships 

 
 Lordship and Castle of Kornberg 
 Lordship and Castle of Rosenburg
 Lordship and Castle of Pottenbrunn
 Lordship and Castle of Zagging

Lord of the manor 
 Lord of the manor Graben near Rudolfswerth (Novo Mesto)
 Lord of the manor Schloss Alt-Grabenhofen in the north of Graz
 Lord of the manor Stein Castle (Carinthia)| Stein
 Lord of the manor Herbstenburg
 Lord of the manor Weidenburg
 Lord of the manor Eppenstein

Castles, residences 
 Ansitz Graben at Lienz
 Burg Bruck at Lienz

See also 
 Von Graben family tree

Notes

External links 

 Von Graben Forschung (german)
 Familienverband Gräff-Graeff e. V. (german, english)
 Das Land Tirol: mit einem Anhange: Vorarlberg: ein Handbuch für Reisende. Von Beda Weber (de)
 Geschichte von Sankt Johann am Graben - Schloss Graben (de)
 De Graeff at the dutch DBNL
 Burg Hohenwang (de)
 Burg Sommeregg (de)
 Burg Heinfels (de)
 Schloss Kornberg (de)
 Schloss Straß in Steiermark (de)
 Ansitz Herbstenburg (de)
 Austro Archiv (Beiträge zur Familiengeschichte Tirols), Graben von Stein (de).
 Rudolf Granichstaedten-Czerva (1948): "Brixen - Reichsfürstentum und Hofstaat".

Austrian noble families